Düzdidil Hanim (from Persian دزد دل duzd-i dil meaning "thief of hearts";  182518 August 1845) was a consort of Sultan Abdulmejid I of the Ottoman Empire.

Life
Düzdidil Hanım was born in 1825. She was half Abkhaz and half Circassian Ubuh. She was presented to Abdulmejid by his mother, Bezmiâlem Sultan. She grew up at the court under the supervision of the chief treasurer. Abdülmecid one day noticed her playing the piano and decided to marry her. She married Abdulmejid in 1840, and was given the title of "Senior Ikbal" (BaşIkbal). 

On 13 October 1841, she gave birth to twins daughters, Neyire Sultan and Münire Sultan in the Old Beşiktaş Palace. The princesses died one as newborn and the other at age of two. 

On 17 August 1843, she gave birth to her third child, a daughter, Cemile Sultan in the Old Beylerbeyi Palace.
On 23 February 1845, she gave birth to her fourth child, a daughter, Samiye Sultan in the Topkapı Palace. The princess died two months later on 15 April 1845.

Charles White, who visited Istanbul in 1843, wrote following about her:

Death

Düzdidil had fallen victim to the epidemic of tuberculosis then raging in Istanbul. A luxuriously decorated prayer book was commissioned around 1844 for her. As was fitting for her position, the prayer book was lavishly ornate. Düzdidil was separated from her alive daughter and isolated, entrusted to the care of her maternal cousin Cican Hanim.

She died on 18 August 1845, and was buried in the mausoleum of the imperial ladies at the New Mosque Istanbul. Cemile Sultan was only two years old when Düzdidil died. She was adopted by another of Sultan Abdulmejid's wives, Perestu Kadın, who was also the adoptive mother one of her half brothers, Sultan Abdul Hamid II.

Issue

In literature
Düzdidil is a character in Hıfzı Topuz's historical novel Abdülmecit: İmparatorluk Çökerken Sarayda 22 Yıl: Roman (2009).

See also
Kadın (title)
Ottoman Imperial Harem
List of consorts of the Ottoman sultans

References

Sources

1825 births
1845 deaths
19th-century deaths from tuberculosis
Tuberculosis deaths in the Ottoman Empire
Consorts of Abdulmejid I